The Spreuer Bridge (formerly also Mühlenbrücke) is one of two extant covered wooden footbridges in the city of Lucerne, Switzerland. Besides the other preserved bridge, the Kapellbrücke, a third bridge of this type – the Hofbrücke – existed in Lucerne, but was demolished in the 19th century.

History 
The first bridge was constructed in the 13th century to connect the Mühlenplatz (Mill Place) on the right bank of the Reuss with the mills in the middle of the river. The extension of the bridge to the left bank was completed only in c. 1408. This was the only bridge in Lucerne where it was allowed to dump chaff (in German: Spreu, therefore the name Spreuerbrücke) and leaves into the river, as it was the bridge farthest downriver. The bridge was destroyed by a flood in 1566 and then rebuilt, together with a granary as the bridge head, called the Herrenkeller.

Totentanz 
The pediments of the Spreuer Bridge contain paintings in the interior triangular frames, which is a feature unique to the wooden bridges of Lucerne. In the case of the Spreuer Bridge, the paintings form a Danse Macabre, known as Totentanz in German, which was created from 1616 to 1637 under the direction of painter Kaspar Meglinger. It is the largest known example of a Totentanz cycle. Of the 67 original paintings, 45 are still in existence. Most of the paintings contain the coat of arms of the donor in the lower left corner and to the right the coat of arms of the donor's wife. The black wooden frames bear explanations in verse and the names of the donors. The paintings also contain portraits of the donors and other exponents of Lucerne society. The painters of Lucerne knew the woodcuts by Hans Holbein the Younger but were more advanced in their painting technique. The images and texts of the Lucerne Danse Macabre are intended to highlight that there's no place in the city, in the country or at sea where death isn't present.

References

Further reading 
 Josef Brülisauer et al.: Die Spreuerbrücke in Luzern. Ein barocker Totentanz von europäischer Bedeutung. Raeber, Luzern 1996. .
 Rolf Paul Dreier: Der Totentanz – ein Motiv der kirchlichen Kunst als Projektionsfläche für profane Botschaften (1425–1650). Leiden 2010. . p. 179-216. 
 Caspar Meglinger: Der Todtentanz. Gemälde auf der Mühlenbrücke in Luzern. Eglin, Luzern 1881. digitized edition at University and State Library Düsseldorf
 The dance of death on the Muhlenbruke at Lucerne. Eglin, Luzern 1893 digitized edition at University and State Library Düsseldorf

External links 

Buildings and structures in Lucerne
Pedestrian bridges in Switzerland
Bridges completed in 1408
Covered bridges in Switzerland
Tourist attractions in the canton of Lucerne
Monuments and memorials in Switzerland
Cultural property of national significance in the canton of Lucerne
Wooden bridges in Switzerland